Phosphoacetylglucosamine mutase is an enzyme that in humans is encoded by the PGM3 gene.

Clinical significance 
Mutations in PGM3 are associated to congenital disorder of glycosylation.

References

Further reading

External links